Kayalıdere may refer to:

 Kayalıdere, Bigadiç, a village in Balıkesir province, Turkey
 Kayalıdere, Göynük, a village in Bolu province, Turkey
 Kayalıdere, Susurluk, a village in Balıkesir province, Turkey